Sergey Alexandrovich Martinson (– 2 September 1984) was a Russian eccentric comic actor, the master of pantomime, buffoonery and grotesque. He became People's Artist of the RSFSR in 1964.

Sergey Alexandrovich Martinson was born in Saint Petersburg in the family of Swedish and Russian descent. His parents adored theater and took their son to many performances. As a schoolboy, Sergey played in a theatrical studio.

After one year of education in the Technological institute, he decided to become a professional actor. At the entrance exams he read Boris Godunov's monologue from Pushkin's play. The exam board roared with laughter, but refused to accept him. He later joined the theatrical institute from a second attempt.

Martinson worked in several theaters. In 1924–1941 he played in the Theatre of the Revolution. In 1925–1926, 1929–1933, 1937–1938 he was the leading actor of Vsevolod Meyerhold's theatre. He was cast by Meyerhold in the plays The Government Inspector, Mandate and others. From 1933 to 1936 he worked in the music hall. From 1945 until his death Martinson was a film actor.

He was mainly a comic actor and seldom appeared in dramatic roles. One of these was the role of Karandyshev in Alexander Ostrovsky's play Without a Dowry, staged by Yury Zavadsky. Martinson's career in film started in 1924, when he played his first role of evil genie "Coolidge Curzon Poincare" in the film The Adventures of Oktyabrina.

Martinson was the first in the Soviet cinema to play Hitler in the Sergei Yutkevich film The New Adventures of Soldier Švejk. Actor told, that Hitler, after seeing himself on the screen, included him into his personal  black list  and promised to hang Martinson on the first lamppost. After the role of composer Kerosinov in the movie Anton Ivanovich is Angry glory literally followed on Martinsons heels – the boys in the courtyard hooted after him:  Benzin-kerosene goes!.

One of his latest roles was the role of Mr. Frankland in the adaptation of Arthur Conan Doyle's novel The Hound of the Baskervilles.

He married his first wife, Ekaterina Il'inichna Ilyina (born: 1900, St Petersburg, Russia, died: 1985, New York, USA), a beautiful actress, in 1927, whom he met during his acting studies; their daughter, Anna, later a successful artist and costume designer, was born in 1928 (died New York, 2012), she married the russian conductor and violist Rudolf Barshai (1924-2010). Although they had never officially divorced, he married his second wife, dancer Lola Dobrohotova, who was later exiled by the government for alleged  connections to "foreign elements"  and died in exile; they had a son, Alexander (1939-2001). His third wife, Luisa (born: Ukraine, 1929, died: 2018, USA) was a woman 30 years junior to Martinson. They had a daughter, Natasha (born 1956) and divorced several years later.

Selected filmography

 The Adventures of Oktyabrina (1924, Short)
 The Devil's Wheel (1926)
 Little Brother (1927, Short)
 Две встречи (1932) - Col. Belov
 The Deserter (1933)
 Marionettes (1934) - Sol - The Hairdresser
 Revolt of the Fishermen (Восстание рыбаков) (1934) - Herr Bredel, fishing magnate
 Loss of Sensation (1935) - Dizer
 Ревизор (1936)
 Рыцари гусиного пера (1936)
 Приключения Петрушки (Петрушка-иностранец) (1936)
 Друзья из табора (1938) - Golovin
 The Oppenheim Family (1939) - Gutwetter, poet
 The Golden Key (Золотой ключик) (1939) - Duremar, village knave
 Stepan Razin (Степан Разин) (1939) - Fedor Shpyn
 Дезертир (1939)
 Ветер с востока (1940) - Stefan
 Антон Иванович сердится (1941) - Kerosinov
 Boyevoy kinosbornik 6 (1941) - Nazi pilot (segment 'Nenavist')
 Boyevoy kinosbornik 7 (1941) - Adolf Hitler (segment "Samyy khrabryy")
 Волшебное зерно (1942)
 Boyevoy kinosbornik 11 (1942) - Friedrich Gopp (segment "The Career of Lt. Gopp")
 Schweik gotovitsya k boyu (1942) - German officer / dummy
 Карьера лейтенанта Гоппа (1942)
 Юные партизаны (1942)
 Lermontov (Лермонтов) (1943) - Baron de Brabant / Stepan Stepanovich
 Uchitelnitsa Kartashova (1943) - German soldier
 Новые похождения Швейка (Солдатская сказка) (1943) - Adolf Hitler
 The Wedding (1944) - Yat - telegraph operator
 Silva (1944) - Boni
 We from the Urals (1944)
 Secret Agent (Подвиг разведчика) (1947) - Willi Pommer
 The Third Blow (Южный узел) (1948) - Adolf Hitler
 Erkrord karavan (1950)
 The Unforgettable Year 1919 (1951) - Sluzhashchiy ministerstva
 Przhevalsky (Пржевальский) (1952) - Shatilo - Professor
 Sadko (1953) - The Monk
 Attack from the Sea (1953) - King Ferdinand
 Сеанс гипноза (1953)
 Безумный день (1956) - Miusov
 Ilya Muromets (1956) - Mishatychka
 The Snow Queen (1957) - Karraks (voice)
 The Idiot (Идиот ("Настасья Филипповна") (1958) - Lebedev
 V nashem gorode (1959)
 Черноморочка (1959) - Vitaliy Omelskiy
 Произведение искусства (1959)
 The Adventures of Buratino (1960) - Medicine Man Mantis (uncredited)
 Spasite nashi dushi (1960) - Norton Masefield
 Chelovechka narisoval ya (1960) - (voice)
 Спасите наши души (1960)
 Scarlet Sails (Алые паруса) (1961) - Filipp
 Volnyy veter (1961) - Kabatchik
 The Night Before Christmas (Вечера на хуторе близ Диканьки) (1961) - Osip, the Sacristan
 Wind of Freedom (Вольный ветер) (1961) - Kabatchik
 Klyuch (1961) - (voice)
 Funny Stories (1962) - Dyadya s sobyakoy
 The Wild Swans (1962) - The Monk (voice)
 Веселые истории (1962)
 Знакомый адрес (1963)
 Jalgrattataltsutajad (1964) - Staryj gonshchik
 Укротители велосипедов (1964)
 Tale about the Boy-Kibalchish (Сказка о Мальчише-Кибальчише) (1964)
 A Tale of Lost Times (1964) - Older Prokofi Prokofyevich
 Москва-Генуя (1964) - Louis Barthou
 Тридцать три (1965) - Valentin Petrovich, otets Rozochka
 Rats ginakhavs, vegar nakhav (1965) - Prince Boris
 Skazka o Malchishe-Kibalchishe (1965) - Uncle 518
 Спящий лев (1965)
 Иные нынче времена (1966)
 The Dream of a Ridiculous Man (Дядюшкин сон) (1966)
 The Tale of Tsar Saltan (1967) - opekun Saltana
 Калиф-аист (1968, TV Movie)
 Улыбнись соседу (1968)
 13 porucheniy (1969)
 Ulybnis sosedu (1969)
 The Beautiful Girl (1969) - Lonely Old Man
 Время счастливых находок (1969)
 В тридевятом царстве (1970)
 Ruslan and Lyudmila (Руслан и Людмила) (1972) - Ambassador
 Летние сны (1972) - Chief accountant
 Maugli (1973) - Tabaqui (voice)
 Города и годы (1974) - Percy
 Большой аттракцион (1974) - ded Matvey
 Pro drakona na balkone, pro rebyat i samokat (1976)
 Armed and Dangerous (1978)
 Ярославна, королева Франции (1978)
 The New Adventures of Captain Wrongel (1978) - Sir Want
 The Hound of the Baskervilles (Приключения Шерлока Холмса и доктора Ватсона. Собака Баскервилей) (1981, TV Mini-Series) - Mr. Frankland
 И жизнь, и слезы, и любовь... (1984) - Yegoshkin (final film role)

References

External links
  Wikipedia in Russian
  Biography
  About Sergey Martinson
 

1899 births
1984 deaths
Male actors from Saint Petersburg
People from Sankt-Peterburgsky Uyezd
Russian people of Swedish descent
Russian male silent film actors
Soviet male film actors
Soviet male voice actors
Saint Petersburg State Institute of Technology alumni
People's Artists of the RSFSR